Micro Focus Service Manager is one of the applications acquired by Micro Focus when it purchased part of Hewlett-Packard Enterprise Software (HPES) in 2017. Before 2017, it was owned by HP when it purchased Peregrine Systems in 2005. The application was originally known as PNMS (Peregrine Network Management System). After releasing the first version of PNMS, Peregrine Systems eventually added functionality such as Request Management, Call Management, and Change Management and rebranded the application as Peregrine ServiceCenter.

After the acquisition by HP, the application was rebranded as HP Service Manager and was included in the HP OpenView product suite. HP offers the application as a service desk solution that enables IT to work as a single organization, governed by a consistent set of processes to handle service delivery and support quickly and efficiently.

After the acquisition, the product has been updated with the following significant changes:
 ServiceCenter 3: Client and GUI
 ServiceCenter 4: Process Model and Module Alignment
 ServiceCenter 5 / 5.1: Client, GUI, introduction of Document Engine
 ServiceCenter 6: New Client, New Server-side Application stack (servlets), inclusion of JavaScript, inclusion of SOAP
 Service Manager 7 / 7.11: GUI, Web Client, Process Model (IIA)
 Service Manager 9.2: GUI, introduction of Process Designer
 Service Manager 9.40: Reporting, Smart Analytics.
 Service Manager 9.41: Smart Search, autocomplete, undo in ScriptLibrary editor
 Service Manager 9.50: New Service Portal, Smart Email, Smart Chat.

Versions

Functionality 
Service Manager is an ITSM Tool using the ITIL framework providing a web interface for corporate changes, releases and interactions (request fulfillment) supported by a Service catalog and CMDB. For a summary of the functionality, screenshots, data sheets, white papers and more information refer to the sources listed above.

Propel 
Propel is a separate web frontend providing a cut down view of HP Service Manager functions. This front end can be tailored to business requirements for service request, incident and change ticket management.

References

External links 
 Service Manager on microfocus.com
 HP IT Service Management Blog
 HP ITSM on Twitter
 HP ITSM on LinkedIn
 History of HP Service Manager 
 Propel

Business software
Service Manager software